Dermomurex kaicherae is a species of sea snail, a marine gastropod mollusk in the family Muricidae, the murex snails or rock snails.

Description
Original description: "Shell elongated, fusiform, thin and fragile; 3 thin, winglike varices per whorl; body whorl and spire whorls ornamented with 3 large, evenly-spaced spiral cords; intervarical regions with an axial rib composed of 3 large knobs; 3 large cords extend onto backs of winglike varices; entire shell covered with numerous fine spiral threads, giving shell a rough appearance; aperture large, oval, with 6 tiny red denticles along inner edge of lip; entire shell uniform chocolate-brown; interior of aperture brown; columella tan; intritacalx (eroded off much of holotype) tan."

The length of the shell varies between 13 mm and 23 mm.

Distribution
Locus typicus: "Off Cabo La Vela, Goajira Peninsula, Colombia."

This species occurs in the Caribbean Sea (off Colombia) 
and the Lesser Antilles (off the Virgin Islands, St. Croix and Tortola)

References

 Merle D., Garrigues B. & Pointier J.-P. (2011) Fossil and Recent Muricidae of the world. Part Muricinae. Hackenheim: Conchbooks. 648 pp. page(s): 214

External links
 

Gastropods described in 1987
Dermomurex